The 1999 Brabantse Pijl was the 39th edition of the Brabantse Pijl cycle race and was held on 28 March 1999. The race started and finished in Alsemberg. The race was won by Michele Bartoli.

General classification

References

1999
Brabantse Pijl